Archips dissitanus, the  boldly-marked archips moth, is a species of moth of the family Tortricidae. It is found in North America, where it has been recorded from Alberta to Nova Scotia and south to Minnesota and North Carolina in the Appalachian Mountains. The habitat consists of boreal forests.

The wingspan is about 24 mm. The forewings are white with jagged jet black bands in the antemedian, median and postmedian areas. Adults have been recorded on wing from mid-June to late August.

The larvae feed on Abies balsamea and Picea glauca.

References

Moths described in 1879
Archips
Moths of North America